Love Letter is the fourth studio album by Azu, released on 18 January 2012. It was released in two versions: a limited CD+DVD edition and a regular CD Only edition. The limited edition comes with a Music Video Best DVD containing music videos of Azu's past hits, such as "Ima Sugu ni...", "You & I" feat. LOVE LOVE LOVE, and "Jikan yo Tomare feat. SEAMO". The album reached #22 on the Oricon weekly charts and charted for 5 weeks.

Catalog number
 BVCL-302/3 (limited edition)
 BVCL-304 (regular edition)

Track listings
CD
 Stay with Me
 Ring ~M&M~
 Woman
 Ashita no Watashi (明日の私; Tomorrow's Me)
 Heart Beat
 I Like U
 Mr. Right
 Hands Off!!!
 Clear Like Crystal
 Missing You...
 Saigo no Love Song (最後のLove Song; Last Love Song)
 Tomodachi☆★ (トモダチ☆★; Friends)
 Shiawase ni Nareru. (幸せになれる。; Be Happy.)
 Love Letter ~Kimi ga Iru Kara~ (Love letter ~君がいるから~; Because You Are Here)

DVD
 Ima Sugu ni... (いますぐに...; Right Now...) (PV)
 I Will (PV)
 You & I　feat. LOVE LOVE LOVE (PV)
 For You (PV)
 Tashika na Koto (たしかなこと; Important Things) (PV)
 To You... (PV)
 Broken Heart (PV)
 Tomodachi☆★ (トモダチ☆★; Friend☆★) (PV)
 Woman (PV)
 Jikan yo Tomare feat. SEAMO (時間よ止まれ; Stop Time) (PV)
 AZU TV

Charts

Total reported sales: 8,137

External links
 Oricon Profile: Limited Edition | Regular Edition
 Sony Music Profile: Limited Edition | Regular Edition

2012 albums